The Hatokaliotsy Site of Biological Interest is a site of biological interest in Madagascar located near Marolinta, the Menarandra River and the Bay of Langarano.

References

Protected areas of Madagascar
Atsimo-Andrefana